Jack Montgomery may refer to:

 Jack Montgomery (actor) (born 1992), British actor
 Jack Montgomery (footballer) (1876–1940), Scottish footballer
 Jack C. Montgomery (1917–2002), American army officer and Medal of Honor recipient

See also
 John Montgomery (disambiguation)